Brandon Miller (born August 28, 1981) is an American former professional stock car racing driver. He is a former member of the Richard Childress Racing driver development program.

Early career
Miller began his career at the age of 12 in kart racing in the Junior Shifter Kart Association, winning the Grand National championship three times. In 1998, he won the U.S. Nationals while competing in various parts of the world. He would eventually be inducted into the Hall of Champions in San Diego and was named San Diego's "Amateur Athlete of the Month." He began racing stock cars the following season at Irwindale Speedway. In his second year competing, he won four races and twelve top-fives. He then moved to Mesa Marin Raceway and won the track championship in 2002.

NASCAR career
In 2003, he ran four NASCAR Grand National Division, West Series races, finishing in the top-ten twice. He made his major-league NASCAR debut at Mesa Marin, finishing 8th in the No. 6 Chevrolet Silverado owned by Kevin Harvick Incorporated. He ran three more Truck races that season in the No. 68 truck owned by his father; his best finish was 14th at Las Vegas Motor Speedway. The following season he ran another Truck Series race in the No. 2 Team ASE Racing Dodge Ram for Ultra Motorsports at Las Vegas, finishing 20th, as well as making his Busch Series debut with Richard Childress' No. 29 team at Kansas Speedway, where he finished sixteenth.

In 2005, Miller was hired to drive the No. 21 Reese's Chevrolet Monte Carlo in the Busch Series for twelve races, sharing the ride with Kevin Harvick. Miller posted two top-ten finishes over the course of the season and finished 48th in the final standings. Harvick's decision to run the full Busch schedule in 2006 forced Miller out of a permanent position with RCR. He remained with the team as a fabricator and test driver, occasionally practicing and qualifying race cars for the team as necessary. He spent 2007 driving the No. 40 Westerman Companies Chevrolet for Curtis Key.

Miller made his first attempt at a NASCAR race since 2007 when he piloted the No. 14 Chevrolet for NTS Motorsports at Texas Motor Speedway in the Camping World Truck Series on June 8, 2012.

Motorsports career results

NASCAR
(key) (Bold – Pole position awarded by qualifying time. Italics – Pole position earned by points standings or practice time. * – Most laps led.)

Busch Series

Camping World Truck Series

 Season still in progress
 Ineligible for series points

External links
 
 

1981 births
American Speed Association drivers
Living people
NASCAR drivers
People from Rancho Santa Fe, California
Racing drivers from California
Racing drivers from San Diego
International Kart Federation drivers
Richard Childress Racing drivers